Naval Auxiliary Air Facility Hyannis was a United States Navy facility located in Hyannis, Massachusetts operational from 1942 to 1945. It existed as an auxiliary air facility of Naval Air Station Quonset Point.

History
From 1942 to 1943, the facility was operated by the United States Army Air Forces as Hyannis Army Air Field and operated Douglas B-18 Bolo aircraft on anti-submarine patrols under the operational control of Westover Field. In 1943. the United States Navy took control of the facility and trained many aviators.

Redevelopment
Today, the field operates as Barnstable Municipal Airport.

See also
List of military installations in Massachusetts

References

External links
Congressional appropriation for a water tank on the site
Newspaper article on the loss of five airmen

Barnstable, Massachusetts
Defunct airports in Massachusetts
Installations of the United States Navy in Massachusetts
Military airbases established in 1942
Hyannis
Closed installations of the United States Navy
Military installations closed in 1945
1942 establishments in Massachusetts
1945 disestablishments in Massachusetts